Gongabu Bus Park, commonly known as Naya Bus Park, is a central bus station located on the North-East corner of Ring Road in  Kathmandu, Nepal. It serves as both, a domestic hub as well as a local bus terminus in Northern Kathmandu. Locally, it is served by Sajha Yatayat as well as smaller private operators. It is the biggest and busiest bus station in Nepal connecting the capital city with various regions of Nepal. During peak, around 1500 serve the station on daily basis.

History
The facility was constructed in 1999 in collaboration with JICA based on private-public partnership model.

There have been upgrades to the stations from 2015 to 2017, leading to a capacity increase from 450 to 800 parking spaces.

Controversies
The operator of the bus station, Lohtse Multi-Cooperatives Pvt. Ltd., constructed unauthorized business complex inside the station which was against the initial agreement with the city of Kathmandu. In 2009 BS, the agreement was amended to allow such businesses.

References

Kathmandu
Transport in Nepal
Bus stations in Nepal
1999 establishments in Nepal